In abstract algebra an inner automorphism is an automorphism of a group, ring, or algebra given by the conjugation action of a fixed element, called the conjugating element. They can be realized via simple operations from within the group itself, hence the adjective "inner". These inner automorphisms form a subgroup of the automorphism group, and the quotient of the automorphism group by this subgroup is defined as the outer automorphism group.

Definition

This function is an endomorphism of : for all 

An inner automorphism is any automorphism that arises from conjugation.

Inner and outer automorphism groups

The outer automorphism group,  is the quotient group

Therefore the existence and number of inner automorphisms that are not the identity mapping is a kind of measure of the failure of the commutative law in the group (or ring).

An automorphism of a group  is inner if and only if it extends to every group containing .

This is a consequence of the first isomorphism theorem, because  is precisely the set of those elements of  that give the identity mapping as corresponding inner automorphism (conjugation changes nothing).

Non-inner automorphisms of finite -groups
A result of Wolfgang Gaschütz says that if  is a finite non-abelian -group, then  has an automorphism of -power order which is not inner.

It is an open problem whether every non-abelian -group  has an automorphism of order . The latter question has positive answer whenever  has one of the following conditions:
  is nilpotent of class 2
  is a regular -group
  is a powerful -group

Types of groups

The group  is cyclic only when it is trivial.

At the opposite end of the spectrum, the inner automorphisms may exhaust the entire automorphism group; a group whose automorphisms are all inner and whose center is trivial is called complete. This is the case for all of the symmetric groups on  elements when  is not 2 or 6.  When , the symmetric group has a unique non-trivial class of non-inner automorphisms, and when , the symmetric group, despite having no non-inner automorphisms, is abelian, giving a non-trivial center, disqualifying it from being complete.

If the inner automorphism group of a perfect group  is simple, then  is called quasisimple.

Lie algebra case
The notion of inner automorphism for Lie algebras is compatible with the notion for groups in the sense that an inner automorphism of a Lie group induces a unique inner automorphism of the corresponding Lie algebra.

Extension
In particular, the inner automorphisms of the classical groups can be extended in that way.

References

Further reading 
 
 
 
 
 

Group theory
Group automorphisms

de:Automorphismus#Innere Automorphismen